Caorle Lighthouse is an active lighthouse located on a little promontory at the end of the waterfront promenade in Caorle, Veneto on the Adriatic Sea.

Description

The lighthouse is completely automated and managed by the Marina Militare with the identification code number 4272 E.F.

See also
 List of lighthouses in Italy

References

External links

 Servizio Fari Marina Militare

Lighthouses in Italy
Buildings and structures in Veneto